Shri Vithal Education & Research Institute (SVERI) is a charitable educational trust located in Gopalpur, Pandharpur, Maharashtra, India. SVERI has established Engineering College at Pandharpur with approval from All India the Engineering College. SVERI also offers B. Pharmacy and D. Pharmacy courses  Diploma in engineering (Polytechnic).

Undergraduate courses 
 Electronics and Telecommunication Engineering
 Computer science and Engineering
 Mechanical Engineering
 Civil Engineering
- This all four courses are NBA Accredited by 2017.
 B Pharmacy

Diploma in (engineering)
Electronics and Telecommunication Engineering
 Computer science and Engineering
 Mechanical Engineering
 Information technology
 Civil Engineering
 Electrical engineering

Postgraduate courses 
 M.B.A.
 M.E.(Mechanical Engineering-Design)
 M.E.(Electronics and Telecommunication Engineering)
 M.E.(computer science)
 M.E.(Civil Structure)
 M. Pharmacy (Pharmaceutics)
'Electronics and Telecommunication Engineering
Computer science and Engineering
Mechanical Engineering
Civil Engineering
- This all four courses are NBA Accredited by 2017.

B Pharmacy
Diploma in (engineering)

Electronics and Telecommunication Engineering
Computer science and Engineering
Mechanical Engineering
Information technology
Civil Engineering
Electrical engineering

Doctorate courses 
 Ph.D. ( Mechanical Engineering) 
 Ph.D. (Computer science and Engineering)
 Ph.D. ( Electronics and Telecommunication Engineering)
 Ph.D. (Civil Engineering)
 Ph.D. (Pharmacy)

External links 
 Website
 Website

Universities and colleges in Maharashtra
Solapur district
Educational institutions established in 1998
1998 establishments in Maharashtra